The 2007 Pacific League Climax Series (PLCS) consisted of two consecutive series, Stage 1 being a best-of-three series and Stage 2 being a best-of-five. The winner of the series advanced to the 2007 Japan Series, where they competed against the 2007 Central League Climax Series winner. The top three regular-season finishers played in the two series. The PLCS began on with the first game of Stage 1 on October 8 and ended with the final game of Stage 2 on October 18.

First stage

Summary

Game 1

Game 2

Game 3

Second stage

Summary

Game 1

Game 2

Game 3

Game 4

Game 5

References

Climax Series
Pacific League Climax Series